"Bliss" is a song by American singer-songwriter Tori Amos. It is the lead track from Amos' fifth studio album, To Venus and Back. "Bliss" went to alternative stations on August 6, 1999, and was released commercially in the U.S. on August 24, 1999. The song was not released as a single in the UK, but peaked at # 91 in the US.

Atlantic released "Bliss" in CD, cassette, 7" vinyl and a CD5 maxi single. The CD single contains the non-LP live version of "Hey Jupiter", while the CD5 maxi also includes the non-LP version of "Upside Down". Both of the live tracks do not appear on the album To Venus and Back. The regular CD single cardboard packaging does not include the extra photo with the "Bliss" lyrics that was part of the CD maxi single. The "Bliss" video premiered on MTV 120 Minutes on August 15, 1999. The video uses footage that was filmed during the final two shows of the Plugged '98 tour in Michigan.

Meaning and interpretation

Track listing

US CD single
"Bliss" – 3:40
"Hey Jupiter" (Live) – 4:31

US CD maxi single
"Bliss" – 3:40
"Hey Jupiter" (Live) – 4:31
"Upside Down" (Live '99) – 5:46

US 7" single (Atlantic 7-84532)
"Bliss" – 3:39
"Hey Jupiter" (Live non LP track) – 4:33

Charts

References

Tori Amos songs
1999 singles
Songs written by Tori Amos
Atlantic Records singles
1999 songs